Ian Michael Stanger (born 5 October 1971) is a Scottish cricketer. He is a right-handed batsman and a right-arm medium-pace bowler.

Stanger appeared in four One Day Internationals in the World Cup in May 1999 and one in June 2006. Stanger played List A cricket between 1992 and 2006; and first class cricket between 1997 and 2006. He functioned as an alternate batsman for the Scottish side, neither particularly high up or low down in the batting order, with a high score of 27, and thus he sometimes input with influential innings when given the bat.

After his cricket career, Stanger became a town planner, and also coached cricket teams in Perth, Sydney and Melbourne, Australia.

References

1971 births
Living people
Scottish cricketers
Leicestershire cricketers
Scotland One Day International cricketers
Cricketers at the 1998 Commonwealth Games
Cricketers at the 1999 Cricket World Cup
Cricketers from Glasgow
Commonwealth Games competitors for Scotland